The 2015–16 daytime network television schedule for four of the five major English-language commercial broadcast networks in the United States covers the weekday daytime hours from September 2015 to August 2016. The schedule is followed by a list per network of returning series, and any series canceled after the 2014–15 season.

Affiliates fill time periods not occupied by network programs with local or syndicated programming. PBS – which offers daytime programming through a children's program block, PBS Kids – is not included, as its member television stations have local flexibility over most of their schedules and broadcast times for network shows may vary. Also not included are stations affiliated with Fox (as the network does not air a daytime network schedule or network news), MyNetworkTV (as the programming service also does not offer daytime programs of any kind), and Ion Television (as its schedule is composed mainly of syndicated reruns).

Legend

 New series are highlighted in bold.

Schedule
 All times correspond to U.S. Eastern and Pacific Time scheduling (except for some live sports or events). Except where affiliates slot certain programs outside their network-dictated timeslots, subtract one hour for Central, Mountain, Alaska, and Hawaii-Aleutian times.
 Local schedules may differ, as affiliates have the option to pre-empt or delay network programs. Such scheduling may be limited to preemptions caused by local or national breaking news or weather coverage (which may force stations to tape delay certain programs in overnight timeslots or defer them to a co-operated station or digital subchannel in their regular timeslot) and any major sports events scheduled to air in a weekday timeslot (mainly during major holidays). Stations may air shows at other times at their preference.
 Most of NBC's daytime programming had been preempted from August 6 to 21, 2016 due to the 2016 Summer Olympics from Rio de Janeiro, Brazil.

Monday-Friday

 Note: CBS owned-and-operated and affiliate stations have the option of airing Let's Make a Deal at either 10:00 a.m. or 3:00 p.m. Eastern, depending on the station's choice of feed.

Saturday

Notes:
 (‡) ABC and Fox do not handle programming responsibilities for their programming blocks, but offers syndicated blocks of E/I-compliant programming that are intended for exclusive distribution to their stations. Litton's Weekend Adventure is offered to ABC stations by arrangement with Litton Entertainment and Xploration Station is offered to Fox stations by arrangement with Steve Rotfeld Productions.
 To comply with FCC educational programming regulations, stations may defer certain programs featured in their respective network's E/I program blocks to determined weekend late morning or afternoon time periods if a sporting event is not scheduled in the timeslot or in place of paid programming that would otherwise be scheduled.
 Airtimes of sporting events may vary depending on the offerings scheduled for that weekend. Scheduling overruns may occur due to events going into overtime, weather delays or other game stoppages, preempting scheduled local or syndicated programming.

Sunday

Notes:
 To comply with FCC educational programming regulations, stations may defer certain programs featured in their respective network's E/I program blocks to determined weekend late morning or afternoon time periods if a sporting event is not scheduled in the timeslot or in place of paid programming that would otherwise be scheduled.
 Airtimes of sporting events may vary depending on the offerings scheduled for that weekend. Scheduling overruns may occur due to events going into overtime, weather delays or other game stoppages, preempting scheduled local or syndicated programming.

By network

ABC

Returning series:
ABC World News Tonight with David Muir
ESPN on ABC
ESPN College Football on ABC
The Chew
General Hospital
Good Morning America
Litton's Weekend Adventure(‡)
Born to Explore with Richard Wiese
Jack Hanna's Wild Countdown
Ocean Mysteries with Jeff Corwin
Sea Rescue
The Wildlife Docs 
The View
This Week with George Stephanopoulos

New series:
Litton's Weekend Adventure(‡)
Rock the Park (moved from The CW's One Magnificent Morning)

Not returning from 2014–15:
Litton's Weekend Adventure(‡)
Outback Adventures with Tim Faulkner

CBS

Returning series:
The Bold and the Beautiful
CBS Dream Team
Dr. Chris Pet Vet
Game Changers with Kevin Frazier
Lucky Dog
The Henry Ford's Innovation Nation with Mo Rocca
CBS Evening News with Scott Pelley
CBS This Morning
CBS Sports
College Football on CBS/SEC on CBS
NFL on CBS
The NFL Today
CBS Sunday Morning
Face the Nation
Let's Make a Deal
The Price is Right
The Talk
The Young and the Restless

New series:
CBS Dream Team
Chicken Soup for the Soul's Hidden Heroes
The Inspectors
CBS Weekend News

Not returning from 2014–15:
CBS Dream Team
All In with Laila Ali
Recipe Rehab

The CW

Returning series:
The Bill Cunningham Show
One Magnificent Morning
Calling Dr. Pol
Dog Whisperer with Cesar Millan: Family Edition
Dog Town, USA
Expedition Wild
Rock the Park (moved to ABC's Litton's Weekend Adventure)

New series:
One Magnificent Morning
Dream Quest
Hatched
Save Our Shelter

Not returning from 2014–15:
One Magnificent Morning
The Brady Barr Experience

Fox

Returning series:
Fox News Sunday
Fox Sports
Fox NFL
Fox NFL Sunday
Xploration Station(‡)
Xploration Animal Science
Xploration Awesome Planet
Xploration Outer Space
Xploration Earth 2050
Weekend Marketplace

New series:
Fox Sports
Fox NFL Kickoff
Xploration Station(‡)
Xploration DIY Sci
Xploration FabLab
Xploration Nature Knows Best
Xploration Weird But True

NBC

Returning series:
Days of Our Lives
Meet the Press
NBC Kids 
Astroblast!
The Chica Show
Earth to Luna!
LazyTown (reruns only)
Noodle and Doodle
Ruff-Ruff, Tweet and Dave
Tree Fu Tom
NBC Nightly News with Lester Holt
Today

New series:
NBC Kids
Clangers
Floogals
Nina's World
Terrific Trucks

Not returning from 2014–15:
NBC Kids
Poppy Cat (continues on Sprout)

See also
2015–16 United States network television schedule (prime-time)
2015–16 United States network television schedule (late night)

References

Sources
 
 
 

United States weekday network television schedules
2015 in American television
2016 in American television